Rebecca Cremona is a Maltese film director. She is the director and co-writer of Simshar, the first Maltese film to be submitted for the Academy Award for Best Foreign Language Film.

Education 
Cremona obtained a BA in Film and Comparative Literature from the University of Warwick and an MA in Broadcast Cinema at the Art Center College of Design. She also studied at the American Film Institute Conservatory in Los Angeles.

Career 
Early in her career, Cremona worked on a number of films shot in Malta, most notably Munich and Agora. In 2009 she directed a short film called Magdalene, which went on to win a Student EMMY and a Directors Guild of America award. In 2014 she directed Simshar, a film which tells the story of the Simshar incident, whereby four persons died in an explosion on a shipping vessel off the coast of Malta.

Simshar was submitted for consideration for the Best Foreign Language Film at the 87th Academy Awards, the first ever Maltese film to be submitted for this award. Simshar is widely referred to as the first ever Maltese international feature film.

It is reported that Cremona is working on a feature film titled The Gut, based in the Strait Street area of Valletta, which will feature Maisie Williams in the lead role.

Filmography

References 

Maltese film directors
Living people
Maltese artists
Maltese women film directors
Year of birth missing (living people)
Maltese women artists